Khotkovo is a town in Sergiyevo-Posadsky District of Moscow Oblast, Russia, located on the Moscow–Yaroslavl railway,  northeast of Moscow and  southwest of Sergiyev Posad, the administrative center of the district. Population:    20,000 (1974).

History
It was first attested in 1308. It was granted a town status in 1949.

Administrative and municipal status
Within the framework of administrative divisions, it is, together with twenty-nine rural localities, incorporated within Sergiyevo-Posadsky District as the Town of Khotkovo. As a municipal division, the Town of Khotkovo is incorporated within Sergiyevo-Posadsky Municipal District as Khotkovo Urban Settlement.

Economy
The town's main industrial enterprises are Electroizolit, an electrical insulation manufacturer; Gorbunoskaya weaving mill; and a carving workshop.

Education
Education facilities include a number of secondary schools, Abramtsevo Art and Industry College, and a music school.

Sights
The town is the site of a monastery, founded by the parents of St. Sergius of Radonezh (picture). The 19th-century artists' community of Abramtsevo is situated within three miles from Khotkovo.

References

Notes

Sources

External links

Official website of Khotkovo 
Khotkovo Business Directory 

Cities and towns in Moscow Oblast